The Directorate-General for Traffic (DGT) is a component of the Spanish Department of the Interior responsible for the execution of the government's road policy in the Spanish road transport network. The DGT is both an administrative body and an autonomous agency, acting as Central Traffic Headquarters (JCT).

Organisation
The DGT is made up 50 provincial headquarters, one for each province, two local headquarters in Ceuta and Melilla and 14 local offices (Alcorcón, Alzira, Cartagena, Fuerteventura, Gijón, Ibiza, Lanzarote, La Línea de la Concepción, Menorca, La Palma, Sabadell, Santiago de Compostela and Talavera de la Reina).

Director-general
The Director-General is a civil servant who is responsible for the day-to-day operations of the DGT. The current director-general is Pere Navarro Olivella. Navarro Olivella already served as Director-General for Traffic between 2004 and 2012.

Former directors general
 Carlos Muñoz-Repiso y Vaca (1971-1974)
 José Ignacio San Martín López (1974-1976)
 Jesús García Siso (1976-1978)
 José María Fernández Cuevas (1978-1980)
 Antonio Ramón Bernabéu González (1980-1982)
 José Luis Martín Palacín (1982-1986)
 David León Blanco (1986-1987)
 Rosa de Lima Manzano Gete (1987-1988)
 Miguel María Muñoz Medina  (1988-1996)
 Carlos Muñoz-Repiso Izaguirre (1996-2004)
 Pere Navarro Olivella (2004-2012)
 María Seguí Gómez (2012-2016)
 Cristóbal Cremades Rodríguez (2016-2016)
 Gregorio Serrano (2016-2018)
 Pere Navarro Olivella (2018–present)

References

External links
 Official website

Motor vehicle registration agencies
Spain articles needing attention
Government of Spain